Tabon Island may refer to:
 Tabon Island (Chile)
 Tabon Island (Philippines)